Kannur Lok Sabha constituency is one of the 20 Lok Sabha (parliamentary) constituencies in Kerala state in southern India.

Assembly Segments

Kannur Lok Sabha constituency is composed of the following assembly segments:

Members of Parliament 

As Kannur in Malabar District

As Thalassery

As Kannur

Election results

General Election 2019

General Election 2014

See also
 Kannur district
 List of Constituencies of the Lok Sabha
 2019 Indian general election in Kerala

References

External links
 Election Commission of India: https://web.archive.org/web/20081218010942/http://www.eci.gov.in/StatisticalReports/ElectionStatistics.asp
 2019 Kannur Lok Sabha Constituency Election Results and Candidates List

Lok Sabha constituencies in Kerala
Politics of Kannur district